Mihalis Papayiannakis (19 August 1941 – 26 May 2009) was a Greek politician. He was born in Kalamata; his father was executed by the Nazis during World War II. He died on 26 May 2009 after a long battle with cancer.

Life
He studied law, economics and political science at the universities of Athens, Montpellier and Paris.

Professional career
He taught at Panthéon-Assas University, the Institute of Business Management at Orsay and the Mediterranean Agronomical Institute at Montpellier (IAMM). From 1967 to 1987, his research areas included the Mediterranean economy, the European Community, the Chinese agricultural industry, and fishing. He was a contributor to several newspapers and magazines.

Political career
At first a member of United Democratic Left until 1963. From 1967 to 1973, he was a member of the anti-junta Democratic Defence. In 1987, he was a founding member of the Greek Left, which later became Synaspismos.

He was elected MEP for Synaspismos in the 1989, 1994 and 1999 European Parliament elections. He lost a bid for the party leadership to Alekos Alavanos in December 2004.

In the 2007 Greek general election, he was elected with the Coalition of the Radical Left MP for the Athens B constituency.

References

External links
 Papagiannakis' website
 Athens News Agency report on his death
 

1941 births
2009 deaths
Politicians from Kalamata
Deaths from cancer in Greece
Coalition of Left, of Movements and Ecology politicians
Greek Left politicians
Greek MPs 2007–2009
Coalition of Left, of Movements and Ecology MEPs
MEPs for Greece 1989–1994
MEPs for Greece 1994–1999
MEPs for Greece 1999–2004